Gopalanand Swami (1781–1852) was a paramhansa of the Swaminarayan Sampradaya who was ordained by Swaminarayan. He worked and guided many followers to spread the Swaminarayan Sampradaya. The Swaminarayan Sampradaya believes that Gopalanand Swami is regarded as one of the yogis who attained the positions of Ashthangyog or the 8 fold paths in the field of sacred yog. It is also believed that Gopalanand Swami was appointed as the head of both Vadtal and Ahemdabad Desh.

Biography

Born as Khushal Bhatt, he was born in the Arvalli District's, Torda Village of Idar, Sabarkantha, Gujarat. His father was an audichiya brahmin, Motiram Bhatt and his mother was Jiveeba Bhatt. Gopalanand Swami pursued deep study and showed great interest of grammar, Indian philosophy of Nyaya and Vedanta. Gopalanand Swami was a scholar, with knowledge in Vyakaran (grammar), Nyaya, Mimasa, astrology. He was married to Adityabai and had two children Harisankar and Anupamba though he felt no attachment. Swaminarayan gave diksha (the becoming of a saint in which vows such as celibacy and renunciation of all personal possessions and of all worldly duties, including family ties are taken) to Gopalanand Swami in Akshar ordi(Gadhada), Gujarat. Swaminarayan held Gopalanand Swami in very high regard and he was very learned in Ashtang yoga. Gopalanand Swami Returned to Akshardham in 1852 at place Vadtal.

Responsibility of the Swaminarayan Sampradaya

When Swaminarayan returned to his abode (1 June 1830), he left responsibility of the Swaminarayan Sampradaya and the Acharyas in his hands and he looked after the satsang after Swaminarayan went to Akshardham .

Sarangpur temple

Gopalanand Swami arranged for an idol of Kastabhanjan Dev Hanumanji to be installed in the Sarangpur temple which is said to have come alive and moved when installed by him.

Works

Sanskrit Books 

 Vivekdeep
 Vishnuyaag Paddhati
 Pujavidhi
 Bhakti Siddhi
 Haribhakta Namavali
 Brahmasutrarthdeep
 Ishadi Upanishad Bhashya
 Shreemad Bhagwad Geeta Bhashya
 Commentary on Second Canto of Shreemad Bhagwat (Sukabhipray Bodhini Tika)
 Dasham Skandh Goodharth Bodhini Tika
 Ekadash Skandh Krushnabhipray Bodhini Tika
 Ved Stuti Shrutyarth Bodhini Tika and Anvayarth Bodhini Tika
 Shandilya Sutra Bhakti Prakashika Tika etc.

Vernacular Books 

 Varta Vivek
 Advait Khandan
 Marathi Translation of Shikshapatri 
 Updeshi Vartao
 Puja Paddhati na Pana
 Bhaktisiddhi Bhashantar (Translation of Bhaktisiddhi)
 Sampraday Pradeep

Notes

References
 

Swaminarayan Sampradaya
People from Sabarkantha district
1781 births
1852 deaths
Vaishnava saints